Samuel Wellings, known professionally as Kim Dracula, is an Australian trap metal/hardcore music artist from Hobart, Tasmania whose songs have achieved popularity on TikTok. They are known both for original work and for metal covers of songs not typically associated with the genre.

Kim Dracula was previously the vocalist of Australian heavy metal band Jesterpose, which formed in 2017 and released the EP COVID-19 in 2020.

Musical career
In November 2020, Kim Dracula released a TikTok metal cover of "Paparazzi" by Lady Gaga. The song was subsequently released to Spotify on 11 December 2020. Their "Paparazzi" cover acquired viral popularity within months, with six million views on YouTube, thirteen million plays on Spotify, and use in over 60,000 TikTok clips before the end of the year. The runaway success of the song propelled Kim Dracula to fourth-most followed Australian TikTok music artist of 2020, trailing Sia, Iggy Azalea, and Mia Rodriguez.

Upon achieving one million plays of their "Paparazzi" cover, Kim Dracula uploaded a celebratory TikTok video with the caption "This is only the beginning ❤️". In January 2021, "Paparazzi" entered Spotify's Global Viral 50 chart, where it reached as high as number 4 on 13 January. The same month, Kim Dracula opened at number 47 on the Billboard Emerging Artists chart, fueled mostly by the success of "Paparazzi" which entered the Hot Rock & Alternative Songs chart at number 31.

By April 2021, Kim Dracula's "Paparazzi" cover had 13.4 million views on TikTok, 33 million views on YouTube, and 55 million listens on Spotify, while Kim Dracula had ascended to becoming the second most followed Australian TikTok personality, with only Sia having more followers.

Kim Dracula's 2022 singles "Make Me Famous" and "Drown" were reviewed favorably by Rock Sound magazine, the latter track being described as "a barrage of sounds and styles...as weird as it is wonderful."

Discography

Singles

As lead artist

As featured artist

Notes

References 

1990s births
Living people
People from Hobart
Australian TikTokers
Trap metal musicians
21st-century Australian singers
Non-binary musicians
Pseudonymous artists
Year of birth missing (living people)